Robert "Bob" Kupsch (27 November 1933 – 3 March 1998) was an Australian rules footballer who played in the Victorian Football League (VFL).

Robert Kupsch, who was recruited from Edithvale-Aspendale, played in both the losing 1955 and 1956 Grand Finals for Collingwood against Melbourne. In early 1957 he transferred to St. Kilda where he played until the end of the 1958 VFL season.  He coached Sandhurst in 1959 and 1960 and then Tyntynder in 1961 and 1962.

References

External links

Australian rules footballers from Victoria (Australia)
Collingwood Football Club players
St Kilda Football Club players
Sandhurst Football Club players
1933 births
1998 deaths